Body Language - How to read others' thoughts by their gestures is a best-selling book by Allan Pease, first published in 1981. It has been superseded by his 2004 book The Definitive Book of Body Language: The Secret Meaning Behind People's Gestures, co-authored this time with his wife Barbara.

References

1981 non-fiction books
Popular psychology books